The 1977 Giro di Lombardia was the 71st edition of the Giro di Lombardia cycle race and was held on 8 October 1977. The race started in Seveso and finished in Como. The race was won by Gianbattista Baronchelli of the Scic team.

General classification

References

1977
Giro di Lombardia
Giro di Lombardia
1977 Super Prestige Pernod